Trey Lewis (born November 27, 1959) is an American tennis player who played professionally in the first half of the 1980s.

As a qualifier she advanced past the first round of the 1979 U.S. Open, where she was beaten by Sabina Simmonds in the second round. This was her best performance in a Grand Slam tournament.

Lewis was a member of the 1979 USC Women's Tennis All American Team.

She placed second at the 1979 Pan American games in San Juan.

WTA Tour finals

Doubles 2

References

External links
 
 

1959 births
Living people
American female tennis players
USC Trojans women's tennis players
Tennis players at the 1979 Pan American Games
Pan American Games medalists in tennis
Pan American Games silver medalists for the United States